The name Dianmu has been used to name four tropical cyclones in the northwestern Pacific Ocean. The name was contributed by China and literally means "Mother of lightning", a title of the ancient goddess of lighting, Leizi.

Typhoon Dianmu (2004) (T0406, 09W, Helen) – struck Japan.
Severe Tropical Storm Dianmu (2010) (T1004, 05W, Ester)
Tropical Storm Dianmu (2016) (T1608, 11W) - struck Indochina 
Tropical Storm Dianmu (2021) (T2115, 21W)

Pacific typhoon set index articles